RNDr. Vlastimil Klíma (born 19 February 1957 in Benešov, Czech Republic) is a leading cryptographer, computer security expert, and white hat hacker.

As an academic, he taught Applied Cryptography at the Faculty of Mathematics and Physics at Charles University in Prague. He is the author of several works in the field of cryptographic hash functions and digital signatures. Klíma received his doctorate from the Faculty of Mathematics and Physics at Charles University in 1984.

Dr. Klíma is the former Head of the research and development group at the Federal Ministry of Defense of the Czech Republic and the Czech National Security Authority.

Klíma authored the world’s first on-the-fly encryption system, Windows 95 (98/NT/2000). As an ethical hacker, he successfully broke SSL protocol.

He currently works in the digital security sector.

External links
 Personal pages of Vlastimil Klima

1957 births
Living people
Computer security specialists
Modern cryptographers
People from Prague
Czech scientists